One 2 Many was a short-lived Norwegian-Swedish band consisting of Dag Kolsrud (keyboards), Camilla Griehsel (vocals) and Jan Gisle Ytterdal (guitar).

Formed in 1987, the band released their first and only album Mirror on A&M Records in 1988. The Scandinavian pop track "Downtown", was an immediate success in Europe, reaching #1 for five weeks in Norway. In the US the song also a success, reaching #37 on the Billboard Hot 100, #18 on the AC chart and #30 on the Dance chart in May 1989. Three further singles were released, namely "Another Man", "Writing on the Wall" and "Nearly There", but while promotion was still underway, the band had already split. Allmusic labels them a candidate to the "least remembered one-hit wonder ever".

Kolsrud went on to join the band Guys in Disguise, after which he pursued a solo career. He was previously a-ha's world tour musical director (1986-1987). Griehsel met British singer Colin Vearncombe (a.k.a. Black) and married him in 1990. She went on to become an opera singer and has lived and performed in London and Cork, Ireland. In 2008 she released an album, Rum and Chocolate.

Discography

Album

Singles

References

External links
 "Downtown" Music Video

Female-fronted musical groups
Norwegian musical groups
Musical groups established in 1987
Musical groups disestablished in 1989
A&M Records artists